Zhang Dongju is a Chinese archeologist and an associate professor at the College of Earth and Environmental Sciences of Lanzhou University. Zhang's research determined that the Xiahe mandible found in the Baishiya Karst Cave on the Tibetan Plateau shared DNA with fossilized remains found in the Denisova Cave in Siberia. This moved to 120,000 years earlier the dates of earliest proven hominin activities in the Tibetan Plateau, and revealed for the first time that the Denisovan hominins had spread throughout Asia rather than being located only near the Denisova Cave. Zhang's work is considered likely to prompt reconsideration of other fossil remains using ancient protein analysis. Discover, Science News, and Nova all named the discovery to their lists of top science stories of 2019.

Education 
Zhang studied at Shandong University from 2000 to 2004 and graduated with a bachelor's degree in archeology. From September 2004, she pursued graduate studies at Lanzhou University, where she joined the group of climatologist Chen Fahu. Zhang's main research focus was on the Paleolithic sites of the Loess Plateau. She was a visiting scholar in the Department of Anthropology at the University of California, Los Angeles in the United States from January 2008 to September 2009, and then at Römisch-Germanisches Zentralmuseum in Germany from October 2009 to March 2010. She earned her Ph.D. in physical geography from Lanzhou University in December 2010.

Research

After earning her Ph.D., Zhang joined the faculty of environmental archeology at Lanzhou University. Zhang changed her research direction from the Loess Plateau to the Tibetan Plateau and began to study the Xiahe mandible, together with her former advisor Chen Fahu. The Xiahe mandible is a fossilized jawbone found in 1980 by a monk in the Baishiya Karst Cave, which is located in Xiahe County on the northeastern edge of the Tibetan Plateau,  from the Denisova Cave where the only other known Denisovan remains have been found. It was donated to Lanzhou University. According to Zhang, the mandible was so "weird" that Lanzhou researchers could not classify it, and it was overlooked for thirty years.

Zhang investigated the original discovery of the mandible by interviewing local people in Xiahe. They confirmed human bones were found in the cave. When asked in 2019 whether it was possible the story was false, zhang said, "I don't think the local people would lie about this." Because the provenance is uncertain, the research team in 2019 acknowledged they could not prove the fossil came from the Baishaya cave. But they were able to match minerals on the Xiahe mandible to mineral deposits in the cave.

The mandible contained no productive DNA, but in the dentine of the teeth they found collagen proteins. In 2016 Zhang and colleagues started working with Jean-Jacques Hublin of the Max Planck Institute to use ancient protein analysis.

In 2016 local villagers and Buddhists gave Zhang permission to start archeological work within the cave, which is a Buddhist sanctuary. With local permission she led a team to begin excavation in and around the cave in 2018. The team dug two trenches in which they found animal bones with cut marks and a large number of stone tools. In 2019 Zhang told Science, "We do hope we'll find more Denisovans."

Importance and impact
Denisovan DNA is found in modern humans across Asia and Australasia, but Zhang's work connecting the Xiahe mandible to the Denisovans is the first evidence that Denisovans lived anywhere but in the Denisova Cave area. Denisovan DNA, specifically the EPAS1 allele, has been considered to be what allows Sherpas and Tibetans to live at high altitudes in low-oxygen environments. The Xiahe mandible is considered likely to be the oldest hominin fossil on the Tibetan Plateau. Zhang told The Paper "this study will push the history of prehistoric human activities on the Qinghai-Tibet Plateau from 40,000 years ago to 160,000 years ago."

Zhang's classification of the Xiahe mandible as Denisovan is likely to cause scientists to reconsider the classification of other remains using the methods Zhang and her colleagues used.

Discover, Science News and Nova all named the discovery in their lists of Top Science Stories of 2019.

Publications 

 

 
 

 Chen, F. H., Dong, G. H., Zhang, D. J., Liu, X. Y., Jia, X., An, C. B., Ma, M. M., Xie, Y. W., Barton, L., Ren, X. Y., Zhao, Z. J., Wu, X. H. & Jones, M. K. (2015). "Agriculture facilitated permanent human occupation of the Tibetan Plateau after 3600 BP." Science, 347: 248–250.

 Morgan C, Barton L, Bettinger R, Chen FH, Zhang DJ. (2011). "Glacial Cycles and Palaeolithic Adaptive Variability on China's Western Loess Plateaux." Antiquity.  85:369-379.
 Elston R, Dong GH, Zhang DJ, (2011). "Late Pleistocene intensification technologies in Northern China." Quaternary International. 242: 401–405.
 Zhang DJ, Chen FH, Bettinger RL, Barton L, Ji DX, Morgan C, Wang H, Cheng XZ, Dong GH, Guiderson TP, Zhao H. (2010). "Archaeological records of Dadiwan in the past 60 ka and the origin of millet agriculture." Chinese Science Bulletin, 55 (16): 1636–1642.(en)

 Bettinger RL, Barton L, Morgan C, Chen FH, Wang H, Guilderson TP, Ji DX, Zhang DJ. (2010). "The Transition to Agriculture at Dadiwan, People's Republic of China." Current Anthropology,  51 (5): 703–714.

Notes

References 

Chinese women archaeologists
Chinese women anthropologists
Chinese paleoanthropologists
Academic staff of Lanzhou University
Living people
Year of birth missing (living people)
Lanzhou University alumni
Shandong University alumni